Pantigliate (  or  ) is a comune (municipality) in the Metropolitan City of Milan in the Italian region Lombardy, located about  east of Milan.

Pantigliate borders the following municipalities: Rodano, Settala, Peschiera Borromeo, Mediglia.

References

External links
 Official website

Cities and towns in Lombardy